The Charles W. Schneider House is a historic house located at 1750 Ames Place East in Saint Paul, Minnesota, United States.

Description and history 
The home was built in 1890 in the Shingle Style that was popular during that time. It was listed on the National Register of Historic Places on February 16, 1984.

References

1890s architecture in the United States
Houses in Saint Paul, Minnesota
Houses on the National Register of Historic Places in Minnesota
National Register of Historic Places in Saint Paul, Minnesota
Shingle Style houses
Houses completed in 1890
Shingle Style architecture in Minnesota